Eliza Hayward (SP-1414) was a sloop that served in the United States Navy from 1917 to 1918.

The U.S. Navy acquired Eliza Hayward on 24 August 1917 for World War I service.  She served in the 5th Naval District in a non-commissioned status for the next thirteen months.

The Navy returned Eliza Hayward to her owner on 24 September 1918.

References

 
 Department of the Navy: Naval Historical Center Online Library of Selected Images:  U.S. Navy Ships: Eliza Hayward (SP-1414), 1917-1918
 NavSource Online: Section Patrol Craft Photo Archive Eliza Hayward (SP 1414)

Patrol vessels of the United States Navy
World War I patrol vessels of the United States
Sloops of the United States Navy